Diospyros discocalyx is a large tree in the family Ebenaceae. The bark is black. Inflorescences bear three or more flowers. The specific epithet  is from the Latin meaning "disc-shaped calyx". Habitat is lowland mixed dipterocarp forests, but sometimes found up to  altitude. D. discocalyx is endemic to Borneo.

References

discocalyx
Plants described in 1929
Endemic flora of Borneo
Trees of Borneo